Sam Sang Yoon (born Yoon Sang-hyun on January 10, 1970) is a former at-large member of the Boston City Council. He later served as the executive director for the Council of Korean Americans in Washington, DC. He was the first Asian American to hold elected office in Boston. He is a member of the United States Democratic Party.

Early life and education 
Born in Seoul, his family moved to the United States when Yoon was ten months old. Raised in Lebanon, Pennsylvania, he became an American citizen at ten years old. He received an undergraduate degree from Princeton University. After graduating, he spent two years teaching math at urban public schools in New Jersey.

He earned a degree from the John F. Kennedy School of Government at Harvard University. While at the Kennedy School, he worked with the Dudley Square Merchants Association to help them earn a Main Street designation.

Career
After graduating from the Kennedy School, Yoon spent time working as a community organizer in Boston, providing housing for low income seniors and individuals coping with mental illnesses.

He later worked at the Community Builders, the nation's largest non-profit developer. Yoon also spent time working for Abt Associates, a public policy think tank, before becoming the Housing Director for the Asian Community Development Corporation.

Boston City Council 
In 2005, Yoon became the first person in the history of Boston municipal elections to win an at-large council seat on the first attempt. Yoon won despite having lived in the city only for one year prior to his run. After placing 5th in the preliminary election, Yoon received 14.96% of the vote in the general election, placing third among eight candidates for four positions. Yoon's election was hailed by the local media as an important sign of the emergence of "New Boston", in which the city's traditional insider politics are becoming less important than before.

In his first term, he was praised for his efforts to secure $5 million in funding for programs to prevent youth violence. As a result of Yoon's efforts, hundreds of students rallied in the City Council Chambers during the 2006 budget hearing in support of the funding increases. When the measure was rejected and the students were expelled from the Chambers, Yoon voted against the budget. He also voted in favor of a salary increase for government employees, which he said would make positions more desirable for qualified candidates. The increase, which passed, included raising City Councilors' salaries from $75,000 to $87,500. Critics alleged that he did not regularly attend Wednesday Council meetings.

Yoon was re-elected in November 2007, after receiving endorsements from many prominent Massachusetts politicians including Governor Deval Patrick and four other City Councilors, including Felix D. Arroyo and Chuck Turner.

Yoon chose not to run for re-election in 2009 in order to run for Mayor of Boston.

Asian Political Leadership Fund 
Yoon is a co-founder of the Asian Political Leadership Fund, a federally designated 527 group whose purpose is to promote political leadership from within the Asian-American community.

2009 Boston mayoral campaign 

On February 8, 2009, Yoon announced he would be running for Mayor of Boston.

Yoon ran on a platform that advocated transparency and accountability at City Hall. He proposed eliminating the Boston Redevelopment Authority (BRA), an organization responsible for planning and development in Boston, and replacing it with community-focused development agency. Yoon also proposed overhauling Boston's transportation infrastructure, advocating a plan that would increase bike accessibility and would promote rapid transit.

Yoon's consultants included Jim Spencer, of the Campaign Network, a direct mail specialist who was the chief strategist on Yoon's city council runs; Jeff Hewitt, a media specialist who was his lead fundraising consultant; Joe Trippi, a social networking specialist who was the former campaign manager for Howard Dean's Presidential Campaign. Yoon's pollster was Tom Kiley, who previously worked for Deval Patrick and Joe Kennedy.

Yoon's strategy was to mobilize progressive voters in Boston who may have voted for Deval Patrick and Barack Obama, but who do not participate in municipal elections, which traditionally have low turnout.  On July 11, Yoon's campaign had a volunteer recruitment session with Joe Trippi which detailed Yoon's strategy for winning.

Yoon’s campaign was the first Boston mayoral campaign by a candidate of East Asian descent.

Yoon placed third among four candidates in the September 22nd primary, receiving 21.16% of the vote. Only the top two finishers advance to the general election.  After the election, second-place finisher Michael Flaherty and Yoon announced they had teamed up with Yoon becoming an unofficial running mate to Flaherty, with Flaherty promising to appoint Yoon "deputy mayor" if he won. The City of Boston government charter does not officially include a position of deputy mayor. What Yoon as deputy mayor might have done, including how he might have been paid, was never officially announced.  Critics charged that this was a cheap political move by Flaherty designed to bring in minority and other voters that might not otherwise vote in the general election. Others praised it as a savvy strategic decision to bring more inclusiveness to City Hall.

Michael Flaherty and his unofficial running mate Sam Yoon went on to lose to incumbent Mayor Thomas Menino in the November 3 general election with 42.43% to Menino's 57.27%.

Post-Campaign 

After his defeat, Yoon said that the Boston establishment shut him out, and he was unable to find work. He announced his decision to leave Boston for Washington, D.C. on June 29, 2010. In Washington, he briefly served as a Senior Policy Advisor in the Department of Labor. He was previously executive director of NACEDA, and was appointed in 2012 as the first full-time Executive Director of the Council of Korean Americans (CKA).

Personal life
Yoon and his wife live in the Washington, D.C. area with their children.

References

External links 
 Official site
 City of Boston page
 Asian Political Leadership Fund

1970 births
American politicians of Korean descent
Asian-American people in Massachusetts politics
Boston City Council members
Harvard Kennedy School alumni
Living people
People from Lebanon, Pennsylvania
People from Seoul
Princeton University alumni
South Korean emigrants to the United States
Massachusetts Democrats